This is a list of all the banks incorporated in Greece  and some defunct banks.

 Extant banks

Central bank 
Bank of Greece

Systemic Greek banks 
Greek banks with a significant presence domestically and overseas with large assets under management, listed in alphabetical order.
Alpha Bank
Eurobank
National Bank of Greece
Piraeus Bank

They typically make up a large part of the market capitalization of the overall stock market in Greece, making them top constituents of relevant indices like MSCI Greece index and the FTSE/Athex Large Cap.

Other banks incorporated in Greece 
Aegean Baltic Bank
Attica Bank
Cooperative Bank of Central Macedonia
Cooperative Bank of Chania
Olympus Cooperative Bank
Cooperative Bank of Epirus
Cooperative Bank of Karditsa
Cooperative Bank of Thessaly
Optima bank
Pancretan Cooperative Bank
Vivabank

Greek branches of international banks 
 ABN AMRO
 American Express
 Bank of America
 Bank of China (Luxembourg)
 Bank of Cyprus
 Bank Saderat Iran
 Barclays
 BMW Austria Bank
 BNP Paribas Securities Services
 Chase Bank
 Citibank Europe
 Deutsche Bank 
 DVB Bank
 EFG Bank (Luxembourg)
 FCA Bank
 FIMBank
 Hamburg Commercial Bank
 HSBC France
 HypoVereinsbank
 Opel Bank
 ProCredit Bank (Bulgaria)
 Rabobank
 Royal Bank of Scotland
 Scotiabank
 Société Générale
 Ziraat Bank
 Defunct banks 
Arab Hellenic Bank
ATEbank (split into "good" and "bad" bank, good bank absorbed into Piraeus Bank)
Bank of Athens (1894)
Bank of Athens (1992)
Bank of Central Greece
Bank of Chios
Bank of Crete (1898)
Bank of Crete (1980)
Bank of Macedonia-Thrace
 Banque de Salonique
Co-operative Bank of Achaia in liquidation, deposits taken over by National Bank of Greece 
Co-operative Bank of Dodecanese (deposits taken over by Alpha Bank)
Co-operative Bank of Evia (deposits taken over by Alpha Bank) 
Co-operative Bank of Lamia
Cooperative Bank of Lesvos-Lemnos
Co-operative Bank of Peloponnese (deposits taken over by National Bank of Greece)
Co-operative Bank of Western Macedonia (deposits taken over by Alpha Bank)
CPB Bank (absorbed into Piraeus Bank)
 Egnatia Bank (merged with Marfin Bank to form Marfin Egnatia Bank)
Emporiki Bank (absorbed into Alpha Bank)
 Ergasias Bank (absorbed into EFG Eurobank)
FBB - First Business Bank (split into "good" and "bad" bank, good bank assets taken over by National Bank of Greece, all former FBB branches closed)
General Bank of Greece (bought by Piraeus Bank)
Ionian Bank (absorbed into Credit Bank, later to become Alpha Bank)
 Laiki Bank
 Marfin Bank (merged with Egnatia Bank to form Marfin Egnatia Bank)
 Marfin Egnatia Bank (Merged with the Cyprus Popular Bank to form Marfin Popular Bank, later renamed CPB Bank)
Millennium Bank (bought by Piraeus Bank)
New Proton Bank (merged into Eurobank in 2013) 
New TT Hellenic Postbank (absorbed into Eurobank Ergasias, now just used by it as a brand)
Omega Bank (renamed Proton Bank)
Panellinia Bank (split into "good" and "bad" bank, good bank assets taken over by Piraeus Bank)
Probank (split into "good" and "bad" bank, good bank assets taken over by National Bank of Greece, branches retain the Probank corporate banking until full merger).
Proton Bank (succeeded by New Proton Bank)
Saxo Bank AS Hellas
T Bank (taken over by TT Hellenic Postbank)
TT Hellenic Postbank (succeeded by New TT Hellenic Postbank)

Banks listed on the Athens Stock exchange
The banks listed on the Athens Stock Exchange are the following (17 August 2015):
 Alpha Bank (symbol: ALPHA ), listed in 1925
 Attica Bank (symbol: ATT ), listed in 1964
 Bank of Cyprus (symbol: BOC ), listed in 2000
 Bank of Greece (symbol: TELL ), listed in 1930
 Eurobank Ergasias (symbol: EUROB ), listed in 1926
 National Bank of Greece (symbol: ETE ), listed in 1905
 Piraeus Bank (symbol: TPEIR ), listed in 1918

Under suspension
 Agricultural Bank of Greece (symbol: ATE ), under suspension since 30 July 2012
 Proton Bank (symbol: PRO ), under suspension since 10 October 2011
 T Bank (symbol: TBANK ), under suspension since 30 November 2011 
 TT Hellenic Postbank (symbol: TT ), under suspension since 30 August 2012

References

See also

 Banking in Greece
Hellenic Financial Stability Fund

 External links 
Hellenic Bank Association
Banks in Greece: Greek Ban[ks Digest
Greek Banks Codes

 
Banks
Greece
Greece